Balser is a surname. Notable people with the surname include:

Ewald Balser (1898–1978), German film actor
Gordon Balser (born 1954), Canadian educator
Jeff Balser (born 1962), American professor

See also
William Balser Skirvin (1860–1944), American real-estate developer
 

Surnames from given names